On 12 January 2019, an explosion occurred 6 Rue de Trevise in 9th arrondissement of Paris, France. Two firefighters, a Spanish tourist, and another woman were killed, and forty-seven others were injured. According to local prosecutor Remy Heitz, the apparent cause of the explosion was a gas leak. Firefighters were present at the time of the blast while investigating a suspected gas leak.

Explosion 
Prior to the explosion, firefighters were at the location responding to reports of a gas leak. The explosion caused a fire that destroyed windows of surrounding buildings and caused cars to be overturned. Eyewitnesses told reporters the blast also caused people to become trapped in other nearby buildings and charred debris and broken glass was spread around the bakery and streets.

Aftermath
More than 200 firefighters responded to the incident, and French Interior Minister Christophe Castaner, Prime Minister Édouard Philippe, and Paris Mayor Anne Hidalgo all visited the scene.

On 15 September 2020, Paris City Hall and a property firm were charged with involuntary manslaughter.

See also
2021 Madrid explosion
List of explosions

References

2019 fires in Europe
Explosion
2019 explosion
Explosions in 2019
2019
2019 explosion
January 2019 events in France
2019 disasters in France